Wolheim, Walheim, and similar names may refer to:

People
 Donald A. Wollheim, American science fiction writer
 Donald Walheim, American heavyweight boxer
 Louis Wolheim, American character actor
 Norbert Wollheim, American accountant and tax advisor
 Rex J. Walheim, American pilot and astronaut
 Richard Wollheim, British philosopher

Places
 Walheim, Germany
 Walheim, Haut-Rhin